WYC may refer to:

Wawasee Yacht Club
Wei-Yin Chen
West Yorkshire Constabulary
Wherry Yacht Charter Charitable Trust
Windsor Yacht Club
Württembergischer Yacht Club
Wycliffe's Bible